Lorry is the British English term for a truck, a large motor vehicle.

Lorry may also refer to:

People
 Anne-Charles Lorry (1726–1783), French physician
 Lorry Sant (1937–1995), Maltese politician

Fiction
 Jarvis Lorry, a fictional character in the Charles Dickens novel A Tale of Two Cities
 The Lorry, a 1977 French film
Lorry (film), Indian Malayalam film released in 1980
 Lorry (TV series), Swedish comedy series from 1989

Transport
Lorry (horse-drawn), a horse-drawn low-loading trolley
Lorry, or a mine car in the US: an open gondola (or railway car) with a tipping trough

Other uses
Lorry, Frederiksberg, a historic building complex in Copenhagen, Denmark
Lorry, the online handle of Michael Lawrie

See also
 Lory (disambiguation)
 Lori (disambiguation)
 Loris (disambiguation)